Rachelia extrusus, the blue-flash skipper, is a butterfly of the family Hesperiidae. It is found along the coast of New Guinea and Cape York in the far north of Australia.

The wingspan is about 30 mm.

The larvae feed on Flagellaria indica.

External links
 Australian Caterpillars

Trapezitinae
Butterflies described in 1867
Butterflies of Oceania
Taxa named by Baron Cajetan von Felder
Taxa named by Rudolf Felder